"Stingy" is a song by American R&B singer Ginuwine. It was written by Johnta Austin, Bryan-Michael Cox, and Jason Perry and recorded by the singer for soundtrack of the American comedy-drama film Barbershop (2002), then included on his fourth album The Senior the following year. Production on the song was helmed by Cox, with co-production from Perry. Released as the lead single from the Barbershop soundtrack, "Stingy" peaked at number 37 on the US Billboard Hot 100 and reached the top ten of the Hot R&B/Hip-Hop Songs chart.

Track listing

Notes
 denotes additional producer
 denotes co-producer

Credits and personnel
Credits lifted from the liner notes of The Senior.

Algebra – background vocals
Johnta Austin – background vocals, writer
Bubble – recording engineer
Bryan-Michael Cox – instruments, producer, writer

Ginuwine  – background vocals, lead vocals
Jason Perry – co-producer, guitar, writer
Sean Thomas – pro-tools editor

Charts

Weekly charts

Year-end charts

References	
	

2002 singles
Ginuwine songs
Barbershop (franchise)
Songs written by Johntá Austin
Songs written by Bryan-Michael Cox
Sony Music singles
2002 songs